The Inventions and Sinfonias, BWV 772–801, also known as the Two- and Three-Part Inventions, are a collection of thirty short keyboard compositions by Johann Sebastian Bach (1685–1750): 15 inventions, which are two-part contrapuntal pieces, and 15 sinfonias, which are three-part contrapuntal pieces. They were originally written as "Praeambula" and "Fantasiae" in the Klavierbüchlein für Wilhelm Friedemann Bach, a Clavier-booklet for his eldest son, and later rewritten as musical exercises for his students.

Bach titled the collection: Forthright instruction, wherewith lovers of the clavier, especially those desirous of learning, are shown in a clear way not only 1) to learn to play two voices clearly, but also after further progress 2) to deal correctly and well with three obbligato parts, moreover at the same time to obtain not only good ideas, but also to carry them out well, but most of all to achieve a cantabile style of playing, and thereby to acquire a strong foretaste of composition.

The two groups of pieces are both arranged in order of ascending key, each group covering eight major and seven minor keys.

The inventions were composed in Köthen; the sinfonias, on the other hand, were probably not finished until the beginning of the Leipzig period. The autograph fair copy is dated 1723.

Media

References

External links

 
 Mutopia's editions of Bach's Inventions and Sinfonias
 History and analysis of Bach's inventions 
 Bach – Inventions ( 43:26 minutes) at BBC's Discovering Music: Listening Library
 Graphical Motif Extraction of the Inventions and Sinfonias

Compositions by Johann Sebastian Bach
Compositions for harpsichord
Bach